Bruno Cristiano Conceição Carvalho Santos (born 17 January 1984 in Fajões, Oliveira de Azeméis), known as Cris, is a Portuguese former professional footballer who played as a midfielder.

References

External links

1984 births
Living people
People from Oliveira de Azeméis
Sportspeople from Aveiro District
Portuguese footballers
Association football midfielders
Primeira Liga players
Liga Portugal 2 players
C.D. Feirense players
Associação Académica de Coimbra – O.A.F. players
Super League Greece players
Asteras Tripolis F.C. players
Cypriot First Division players
AEP Paphos FC players
Portuguese expatriate footballers
Expatriate footballers in Greece
Expatriate footballers in Cyprus
Portuguese expatriate sportspeople in Greece
Portuguese expatriate sportspeople in Cyprus